Emperor Maximilian may refer to:

 Maximilian I, Holy Roman Emperor (1459–1519)
 Maximilian II, Holy Roman Emperor (1564–1576)
 Maximilian I of Mexico, Austrian-born Emperor of Mexico (1861–1867)

See also
Maximilian (disambiguation)